Rusmeris Villar Barboza (born 28 March 1983 in Cartagena) is a female weightlifter from Colombia. She won the silver medal at the 2007 Pan American Games for her native South American country in the – 58 kg weight division.

References
 the-sports.org

External links

1983 births
Living people
Olympic weightlifters of Colombia
Weightlifters at the 2007 Pan American Games
Weightlifters at the 2012 Summer Olympics
Sportspeople from Cartagena, Colombia
Colombian female weightlifters
Weightlifters at the 2015 Pan American Games
Pan American Games silver medalists for Colombia
Female powerlifters
Pan American Games medalists in weightlifting
Central American and Caribbean Games silver medalists for Colombia
Competitors at the 2006 Central American and Caribbean Games
South American Games silver medalists for Colombia
South American Games medalists in weightlifting
Competitors at the 2010 South American Games
Central American and Caribbean Games medalists in weightlifting
Medalists at the 2007 Pan American Games
Medalists at the 2015 Pan American Games
Pan American Weightlifting Championships medalists
20th-century Colombian women
21st-century Colombian women